Idopterum novaepommeraniae is a moth of the subfamily Arctiinae. It was described by Strand in 1922. It is found on the Bismarck Archipelago.

References

 Natural History Museum Lepidoptera generic names catalog

Lithosiini
Moths described in 1922